Elections to Southampton City Council took place on Thursday 5 May 2022, alongside nationwide local elections, alongside other local elections across the country. The seats up for election were last contested in 2018. The Labour Party regained control of the council from the Conservative Party, which it had lost at the previous year's elections.

Results summary

Ward results

Bargate

Bassett

Bevois

Bitterne

Bitterne Park

Coxford

Freemantle

Harefield

Millbrook

Peartree

Portswood

Redbridge

Shirley

Sholing

Swaythling

Woolston

References 

2022 English local elections
2022
2020s in Southampton
2020s in Hampshire
May 2022 events in the United Kingdom